Mirriah  is a department of the Zinder Region in Niger. Its capital lies at the city of Mirriah, although its largest city is Zinder. As of 2011, the department had a total population of 1,080,589 people.

References

Departments of Niger
Zinder Region